Lucian Ioan "Uțu" Covrig (also known as Ionuț Covrig; born 3 May 1977), is a Romanian former professional footballer who played as a goalkeeper. Covrig first match in the Liga I was Ceahlăul Piatra Neamț-Universitatea Cluj 3-1 on 7 June 1997.

References

External links
 

1977 births
Living people
Sportspeople from Piatra Neamț
Romanian footballers
Association football goalkeepers
Liga I players
Liga II players
CSM Ceahlăul Piatra Neamț players
FCV Farul Constanța players